Kashkan Rural District was the only rural district (dehestan) in Shahivand District, Dowreh County, Lorestan Province, Iran until 2007. At the 2006 census, its population was 10,294, in 2,125 families.  The rural district had 37 census recognized villages.

In December 2007, the Kashkan Rural District was divided into North Kashkan and South Kashkan.

References 

Rural Districts of Lorestan Province
Dowreh County